D117 is a state road on Vis Island in Croatia connecting the town of Komiža to Vis ferry port, from where Jadrolinija ferries fly to the mainland, docking in Split and the D410 state road The road is  long.

The road, as well as all other state roads in Croatia, is managed and maintained by Hrvatske ceste, a state-owned company.

Traffic volume 

Traffic is regularly measured and reported by Hrvatske ceste (HC), operator of the road. Substantial variations between annual (AADT) and summer (ASDT) traffic volumes are attributed to the fact that the road connects a number of island resorts.

Road junctions and populated areas

Sources

State roads in Croatia
Transport in Split-Dalmatia County